Pinoy Capital: The Filipino Nation in Daly City is a 2009 non-fiction book by Benito Manalo Vergara and published by Temple University Press. The book received favorable reviews from critics.

Background
In 2006 Daly City, California had a population of approximately 35,000 Filipinos. The Immigration Act of 1965 had significantly increased the influx of Filipinos in the city.

Content
The ethnographic study Pinoy Capital was part of the Asian American History and Culture series from the Temple University Press. For his research, Vergara conducted interviews and analyzed newspaper and journal articles alongside books written previously on the subject. The book consists of eight chapters:  A Repeated Turning, Little Manila, Looking Forward: Narratives of Obligation, Spreading the News: Newspapers and Transnational Belonging, Looking Back: Indifference, Responsibility, and the Anti-Marcos Movement in the United States, Betrayal and Belonging, Citizenship and Nostalgia, and Pinoy Capital.

The book provides details about the city's history from the early 20th century. Following World War II, Daly City witnessed its transition into a "poorly-planned suburbia". It also discusses the role of media in shaping the notion of "belonging" to the mother country. The most prominent newspaper for the community was The Philippine News, which served as a forum for resisting the dictatorial regime of Ferdinand Marcos; popular TV networks include The Filipino Channel (ABS–CBN); and Filipinas magazine is also headquartered in Daly City.

Findings
Vergara reported that the median household income of Filipinos in Daly City was greater than the average national income in the United States. Moreover, instead of being called Filipino-American, a significant part of the community preferred to be identified as Filipinos. A major issue faced by Filipinos residing in the United States was their need to strike a balance between their relation to the two nations. In 2009, remittances sent by the foreign-employed Filipinos comprised 10% of the total GDP of the Philippines. Filipinos holding American citizenship by birthright are thought to have "lost their traditional Filipino values". A considerable number of interviewees cited reuniting with family as their motive for migrating to the United States.

Reception
Writing for Philippine Quarterly of Culture and Society, John A. Peterson called the work "an intriguing and empathic study of Filipinos in Daly City". Kimberly Alidio (Journal of American Ethnic History) opined "Pinoy Capital is significant for its attention to ... nuances of contemporary immigration". Emily Noelle Ignacio of the University of Washington, Tacoma (Contemporary Sociology) called Vergara's work an "[accomplishment]". She further points out that the word Capital used in the book's title might possibly have two meanings; one referring to Daly City as an ideal destination for emigrating Filipinos and the other being the economic benefits to the Philippines from these migrants.

Ignacio praised the book by calling it "rich in empirical material meticulously situated and adeptly analyzed" and an "important contribution to sociological studies" on topics ranging from nationalism to ethnicity. Linda España-Maram (The Western Historical Quarterly) wrote that the work was "significant in the way that Vergara unpacks questions related to socioeconomic standing".

References

Bibliography

External links
 

2009 non-fiction books
American non-fiction books
English-language books
Books about immigration to the United States
Ethnographic literature
Filipino-American culture in California